This page shows the career achievements of Allen Iverson. Allen Iverson played a total of 14 years in the National Basketball Association (NBA) playing for the Philadelphia 76ers, Denver Nuggets, Detroit Pistons, and Memphis Grizzlies. He finished his career with 24,368 points and averaged 26.7 ppg, 3.7 rpg and 6.2 apg in 41.1 minutes per game throughout his career.

NBA career averages

Regular season

|-
| style="text-align:left;"| 
| style="text-align:left;"| Philadelphia
| 76 || 74 || 40.1 || .418 || .341 || .702 || 4.1 || 7.5 || 2.1 || .3 || 23.5
|-
| style="text-align:left;"| 
| style="text-align:left;"| Philadelphia
| 80 || 80 || 39.4 || .461 || .298 || .729 || 3.7 || 6.2 || 2.2 || .3 || 22.0
|-
| style="text-align:left;"| 
| style="text-align:left;"| Philadelphia
| 48 || 48 || style="background:#cfecec;"| 41.5 || .412 || .291 || .751 || 4.9 || 4.6 || 2.3 || .1 || style="background:#cfecec;"| 26.8
|-
| style="text-align:left;"| 
| style="text-align:left;"| Philadelphia
| 70 || 70 || 40.8 || .421 || .341 || .713 || 3.8 || 4.7 || 2.1 || .1 || 28.4
|-
| style="text-align:left;"| 
| style="text-align:left;"| Philadelphia
| 71 || 71 || 42.0 || .420 || .320 || .814 || 3.8 || 4.6 ||style="background:#cfecec;"|  2.5 || .3 || style="background:#cfecec;"| 31.1
|-
| style="text-align:left;"| 
| style="text-align:left;"| Philadelphia
| 60 || 59 || style="background:#cfecec;"| 43.7 || .398 || .291 || .812 || 4.5 || 5.5 ||style="background:#cfecec;"|  2.8 || .2 || style="background:#cfecec;"| 31.4
|-
| style="text-align:left;"| 
| style="text-align:left;"| Philadelphia
| style="background:#cfecec;" | 82 || style="background:#cfecec;"| 82 ||style="background:#cfecec;"|  42.5 || .414 || .277 || .774 || 4.2 || 5.5 ||style="background:#cfecec;"|  2.7 || .2 || 27.6
|-
| style="text-align:left;"| 
| style="text-align:left;"| Philadelphia
| 48 || 47 ||style="background:#cfecec;"|  42.5 || .387 || .286 || .745 || 3.7 || 6.8 || 2.4 || .1 || 26.4
|-
| style="text-align:left;"| 
| style="text-align:left;"| Philadelphia
| 75 || 75 || 42.3 || .424 || .308 || .835 || 4.0 || 7.9 || 2.4 || .1 || style="background:#cfecec;"|  30.7
|-
| style="text-align:left;"| 
| style="text-align:left;"| Philadelphia
| 72 || 72 ||style="background:#cfecec;"|  43.1 || .447 || .323 || .814 || 3.2 || 7.4 || 1.9 || .1 || 33.0
|-
| style="text-align:left;"| 
| style="text-align:left;"| Philadelphia
| 15 || 15 ||style="background:#cfecec;"|  42.7 || .413 || .226 || .885 || 2.7 || 7.3 || 2.2 || .1 || 31.2
|-
| style="text-align:left;"| 
| style="text-align:left;"| Denver
| 50 || 49 ||style="background:#cfecec;"|  42.4 || .454 || .347 || .759 || 3.0 || 7.2 || 1.8 || .2 || 24.8
|-
| style="text-align:left;"| 
| style="text-align:left;"| Denver
| style="background:#cfecec;" | 82 || style="background:#cfecec;"| 82 ||style="background:#cfecec;"|  41.8 || .458 || .345 || .809 || 3.0 || 7.1 || 2.0 || .1 || 26.4
|-
| style="text-align:left;"| 
| style="text-align:left;"| Denver
| 3 || 3 || 41.0 || .450 || .250 || .720 || 2.7 || 6.7 || 1.0 || .3 || 18.7
|-
| style="text-align:left;"| 
| style="text-align:left;"| Detroit
| 54 || 50 || 36.5 || .416 || .286 || .786 || 3.1 || 4.9 || 1.6 || .1 || 17.4
|-
| style="text-align:left;"| 
| style="text-align:left;"| Memphis
| 3 || 0 || 22.3 || .577 || 1.000 || .500 || 1.3 || 3.7 || .3 || .0 || 12.3
|-
| style="text-align:left;"| 
| style="text-align:left;"| Philadelphia
| 25 || 24 || 31.9 || .417 || .333 || .824 || 3.0 || 4.1 || .7 || .1 || 13.9
|-class="sortbottom"
| style="text-align:center;" colspan=2| Career
| 914 || 901 || 41.1 || .425 || .313 || .780 || 3.7 || 6.2 || 2.2 || .2 || 26.7
|-class="sortbottom"
| style="text-align:center;" colspan=2| All-Star
| 9 || 9 || 26.6 || .414 || .667 || .769 || 2.6 || 6.2 || 2.3 || .1 || 14.4

Playoffs

|-
| style="text-align:left;"| 1999
| style="text-align:left;"| Philadelphia
| 8 || 8 || 44.8 || .411 || .283 || .712 || 4.1 || 4.9 || 2.5 || .3 || 28.5
|-
| style="text-align:left;"| 2000
| style="text-align:left;"| Philadelphia
| 10 || 10 || 44.4 || .384 || .308 || .739 || 4.0 || 4.5 || 1.2 || .1 || 26.2
|-
| style="text-align:left;"| 2001
| style="text-align:left;"| Philadelphia
| 22 || 22 || 46.2 || .389 || .338 || .774 || 4.7 || 6.1 || 2.4 || .3 || 32.9
|-
| style="text-align:left;"| 2002
| style="text-align:left;"| Philadelphia
| 5 || 5 || 41.8 || .381 || .333 || .810 || 3.6 || 4.2 || 2.6 || .0 || 30.0
|-
| style="text-align:left;"| 2003
| style="text-align:left;"| Philadelphia
| 12 || 12 || 46.4 || .416 || .345 || .737 || 4.3 || 7.4 || 2.4 || .1 || 31.7
|-
| style="text-align:left;"| 2005
| style="text-align:left;"| Philadelphia
| 5 || 5 || 47.6 || .468 || .414 || .897 || 2.2 || 10.0 || 2.0 || .4 ||31.2
|-
| style="text-align:left;"| 2007
| style="text-align:left;"| Denver
| 5 || 5 || 44.6 || .368 || .294 || .806 || .6 || 5.8 || 1.4 || .0 || 22.8
|-
| style="text-align:left;"| 2008
| style="text-align:left;"| Denver
| 4 || 4 || 39.5 || .434 || .214 || .697 || 3.0 || 4.5 || 1.0 || .3 || 24.5
|-class="sortbottom"
| style="text-align:center;" colspan=2| Career
| 71 || 71 || 45.1 || .401 || .327 || .764 || 3.8 || 6.0 || 2.1 || .2 || 29.7

Awards and accomplishments

NBA achievements

Hall of Famer
Class of 2016 – Individual 
NBA Most Valuable Player – 2001
4x NBA scoring champion
11x NBA All-Star
2x NBA All-Star Game MVP
7x All-NBA
First Team: 1999, 2001, 2005
Second Team: 2000, 2002, 2003
Third Team: 2006
3x NBA steals leader
7x NBA minutes leader
 NBA Rookie of the Year – 1997
 NBA All-Rookie First Team – 1997
 NBA Rookie Challenge MVP – 1997
 Number 3 retired by the Philadelphia 76ers
 2nd youngest player in NBA history to score 50 points in a game.
 2nd highest playoff scoring average in NBA history – 29.7.
 One of three players in NBA history to have a career average of at least 26 points and 6 assists.
 Includes LeBron James and Jerry West.
 One of three players in NBA history to lead the league in points per game and steals per game in the same season.
 Includes Michael Jordan (achieved this three times) and Stephen Curry.
 Only rookie to score 40+ points 5 games in a row

College
 Consensus first-team All-American (1996)
 First-team All-Big East (1996)

Philadelphia 76ers franchise records
 Most points in 3rd quarter – 22 – three times
 Most field goals attempted in a half – 23
 Most free throws made in a game – 24 (tied with Willie Burton)
 Most steals in a game – 9
 Most steals in a quarter – 7
 Most turnovers in a half – 7 – twice
 Most made three-point field goals – 885
 Most attempted three point field goals – 2,864
 Most turnovers in career – 2,662
 Most steals per game – 2.3
 Usage percentage – 33.2

Career highs

Regular season

Note** played with Denver (all others were as a member of the 76ers)

Playoffs

References

Iverson
Philadelphia 76ers
Denver Nuggets
Detroit Pistons
Memphis Grizzlies